Moravia (also  ,  ;  ;  ;  ;) is a historical region in the east of the Czech Republic and one of three historical Czech lands, with Bohemia and Czech Silesia.

The medieval and early modern Margraviate of Moravia was a crown land of the Lands of the Bohemian Crown from 1348 to 1918, an imperial state of the Holy Roman Empire from 1004 to 1806, a crown land of the Austrian Empire from 1804 to 1867, and a part of Austria-Hungary from 1867 to 1918. Moravia was one of the five lands of Czechoslovakia founded in 1918. In 1928 it was merged with Czech Silesia, and then dissolved in 1948 during the abolition of the land system following the communist coup d'état.

Its area of 22,623.41 km2 is home to more than 3 million people.
The people are historically named Moravians, a subgroup of Czechs, the other group being called Bohemians. Moravia also had been home of a large German-speaking population until their expulsion in 1945. The land takes its name from the Morava river, which runs from its north to south, being its principal watercourse. Moravia's largest city and historical capital is Brno. Before being sacked by the Swedish army during the Thirty Years' War, Olomouc served as the Moravian capital, and it is still the seat of the Archdiocese of Olomouc.

Toponymy 
The region and former margraviate of Moravia, Morava in Czech, is named after its principal river Morava. It is theorized that the river's name is derived from Proto-Indo-European *mori: "waters", or indeed any word denoting water or a marsh.

The German name for Moravia is Mähren, from the river's German name March. This could have a different etymology, as march is a term used in the Medieval times for an outlying territory, a border or a frontier (cf. English march).

Geography
Moravia occupies most of the eastern part of the Czech Republic. Moravian territory is naturally strongly determined, in fact, as the Morava river basin, with strong effect of mountains in the west (de facto  main European continental divide) and partly in the east, where all the rivers rise.

Moravia occupies an exceptional position in Central Europe. All the highlands in the west and east of this part of Europe run west–east, and therefore form a kind of filter, making north–south or south–north movement more difficult.

Moravia borders Bohemia in the west, Lower Austria in the southwest, Slovakia in the southeast, Poland very shortly in the north, and Czech Silesia in the northeast. Its natural boundary is formed by the Sudetes mountains in the north, the Carpathians in the east and the Bohemian-Moravian Highlands in the west (the border runs from Králický Sněžník in the north, over Suchý vrch, across Upper Svratka Highlands and Javořice Highlands to tripoint nearby Slavonice in the south). The Thaya river meanders along the border with Austria and the tripoint of Moravia, Austria and Slovakia is at the confluence of the Thaya and Morava rivers. The northeast border with Silesia runs partly along the Moravice, Oder and Ostravice rivers. Between 1782 and 1850, Moravia (also thus known as Moravia-Silesia) also included a small portion of the former province of Silesia – the Austrian Silesia (when Frederick the Great annexed most of ancient Silesia (the land of upper and middle Oder river) to Prussia, Silesia's southernmost part remained with the Habsburgs).

Today Moravia includes the South Moravian Region, the Zlín Region, vast majority of the Olomouc Region, southeastern half of the Vysočina Region and parts of the Moravian-Silesian, Pardubice and South Bohemian regions.

Geologically, Moravia covers a transitive area between the Bohemian Massif and the Carpathians (from northwest to southeast), and between the Danube basin and the North European Plain (from south to northeast). Its core geomorphological features are three wide valleys, namely the Dyje-Svratka Valley (Dyjsko-svratecký úval), the Upper Morava Valley (Hornomoravský úval) and the Lower Morava Valley (Dolnomoravský úval). The first two form the westernmost part of the Outer Subcarpathia, the last is the northernmost part of the Vienna Basin. The valleys surround the low range of Central Moravian Carpathians. The highest mountains of Moravia are situated on its northern border in Hrubý Jeseník, the highest peak is Praděd (1491 m). Second highest is the massive of Králický Sněžník (1424  m) the third are the Moravian-Silesian Beskids at the very east, with Smrk (1278 m), and then south from here Javorníky (1072). The White Carpathians along the southeastern border rise up to 970 m at Velká Javořina. The spacious, but moderate Bohemian-Moravian Highlands on the west reach 837 m at Javořice.

The fluvial system of Moravia is very cohesive, as the region border is similar to the watershed of the Morava river, and thus almost the entire area is drained exclusively by a single stream. Morava's far biggest tributaries are Thaya (Dyje) from the right (or west) and Bečva (east). Morava and Thaya meet at the southernmost and lowest (148 m) point of Moravia. Small peripheral parts of Moravia belong to the catchment area of Elbe, Váh and especially Oder (the northeast). The watershed line running along Moravia's border from west to north and east is part of the European Watershed. For centuries, there have been plans to build a waterway across Moravia to join the Danube and Oder river systems, using the natural route through the Moravian Gate.

History

Pre-history 

Evidence of the presence of members of the human genus, Homo, dates back more than 600,000 years in the paleontological area of Stránská skála.

Attracted by suitable living conditions, early modern humans settled in the region by the Paleolithic period. The Předmostí archeological (Cro-magnon) site in Moravia is dated to between 24,000 and 27,000 years old. Caves in Moravský kras were used by mammoth hunters. Venus of Dolní Věstonice, the oldest ceramic figure in the world, was found in the excavation of Dolní Věstonice by Karel Absolon.

Roman era
Around 60 BC, the Celtic Volcae people withdrew from the region and were succeeded by the Germanic Quadi. Some of the events of the Marcomannic Wars took place in Moravia in AD 169–180. After the war exposed the weakness of Rome's northern frontier, half of the Roman legions (16 out of 33) were stationed along the Danube. In response to increasing numbers of Germanic settlers in frontier regions like Pannonia, Dacia, Rome established two new frontier provinces on the left shore of the Danube, Marcomannia and Sarmatia, including today's Moravia and western Slovakia.

During the reign of the Emperor Marcus Aurelius, the 10th Legion was assigned to control the Germanic tribes who had been defeated in the Marcomannic Wars. In 1927, the archeologist Gnirs, with the support of president Tomáš Garrigue Masaryk, began research on the site, located 80 km from Vindobona and 22 km to the south of Brno. The researchers found remnants of two masonry buildings, a praetorium and a balneum ("bath"), including a hypocaustum. The discovery of bricks with the stamp of the Legio X Gemina and coins from the period of the emperors Antoninus Pius, Marcus Aurelius and Commodus facilitated dating of the locality.

Ancient Moravia

A variety of Germanic and major Slavic tribes crossed through Moravia during the Migration Period before Slavs established themselves in the 6th century AD. At the end of the 8th century, the Moravian Principality came into being in present-day south-eastern Moravia, Záhorie in south-western Slovakia and parts of Lower Austria. In 833 AD, this became the state of Great Moravia with the conquest of the Principality of Nitra (present-day Slovakia). Their first king was Mojmír I (ruled 830–846). Louis the German invaded Moravia and replaced Mojmír I with his nephew Rastiz who became St. Rastislav.  St. Rastislav (846–870) tried to emancipate his land from the Carolingian influence, so he sent envoys to Rome to get missionaries to come. When Rome refused he turned to Constantinople to the Byzantine emperor Michael. The result was the mission of Saints Cyril and Methodius who translated liturgical books into Slavonic, which had lately been elevated by the Pope to the same level as Latin and Greek. Methodius became the first Moravian archbishop, the first archbishop in Slavic world, but after his death the German influence again prevailed and the disciples of Methodius were forced to flee. Great Moravia reached its greatest territorial extent in the 890s under Svatopluk I. At this time, the empire encompassed the territory of the present-day Czech Republic and Slovakia, the western part of present Hungary (Pannonia), as well as Lusatia in present-day Germany and Silesia and the upper Vistula basin in southern Poland. After Svatopluk's death in 895, the Bohemian princes defected to become vassals of the East Frankish ruler Arnulf of Carinthia, and the Moravian state ceased to exist after being overrun by invading Magyars in 907.

Union with Bohemia

Following the defeat of the Magyars by Emperor Otto I at the Battle of Lechfeld in 955, Otto's ally Boleslaus I, the Přemyslid ruler of Bohemia, took control over Moravia. Bolesław I Chrobry of Poland annexed Moravia in 999, and ruled it until 1019, when the Přemyslid prince Bretislaus recaptured it. Upon his father's death in 1034, Bretislaus became the ruler of Bohemia. In 1055, he decreed that Bohemia and Moravia would be inherited together by primogeniture, although he also provided that his younger sons should govern parts (quarters) of Moravia as vassals to his oldest son.

Throughout the Přemyslid era, junior princes often ruled all or part of Moravia from Olomouc, Brno or Znojmo, with varying degrees of autonomy from the ruler of Bohemia. Dukes of Olomouc often acted as the "right hand" of Prague dukes and kings, while Dukes of Brno and especially those of Znojmo were much more insubordinate. Moravia reached its height of autonomy in 1182, when Emperor Frederick I elevated Conrad II Otto of Znojmo to the status of a margrave, immediately subject to the emperor, independent of Bohemia. This status was short-lived: in 1186, Conrad Otto was forced to obey the supreme rule of Bohemian duke Frederick. Three years later, Conrad Otto succeeded to Frederick as Duke of Bohemia and subsequently canceled his margrave title. Nevertheless, the margrave title was restored in 1197 when Vladislaus III of Bohemia resolved the succession dispute between him and his brother Ottokar by abdicating from the Bohemian throne and accepting Moravia as a vassal land of Bohemian (i.e., Prague) rulers. Vladislaus gradually established this land as Margraviate, slightly administratively different from Bohemia. After the Battle of Legnica, the Mongols carried their raids into Moravia.

The main line of the Přemyslid dynasty became extinct in 1306, and in 1310 John of Luxembourg became Margrave of Moravia and King of Bohemia. In 1333, he made his son Charles the next Margrave of Moravia (later in 1346, Charles also became the King of Bohemia). In 1349, Charles gave Moravia to his younger brother John Henry who ruled in the margraviate until his death in 1375, after him Moravia was ruled by his oldest son Jobst of Moravia who was in 1410 elected the Holy Roman King but died in 1411 (he is buried with his father in the Church of St. Thomas in Brno – the Moravian capital from which they both ruled). Moravia and Bohemia remained within the Luxembourg dynasty of Holy Roman kings and emperors (except during the Hussite wars), until inherited by Albert II of Habsburg in 1437.

After his death followed the interregnum until 1453; land (as the rest of lands of the Bohemian Crown) was administered by the landfriedens (landfrýdy). The rule of young Ladislaus the Posthumous subsisted only less than five years and subsequently (1458) the Hussite George of Poděbrady was elected as the king. He again reunited all Czech lands (then Bohemia, Moravia, Silesia, Upper & Lower Lusatia) into one-man ruled state. In 1466, Pope Paul II excommunicated George and forbade all Catholics (i.e. about 15% of population) from continuing to serve him. The Hungarian crusade followed and in 1469 Matthias Corvinus conquered Moravia and proclaimed himself (with assistance of rebelling Bohemian nobility) as the king of Bohemia.

The subsequent 21-year period of a divided kingdom was decisive for the rising awareness of a specific Moravian identity, distinct from that of Bohemia. Although Moravia was reunited with Bohemia in 1490 when Vladislaus Jagiellon, king of Bohemia, also became king of Hungary, some attachment to Moravian "freedoms" and resistance to government by Prague continued until the end of independence in 1620. In 1526, Vladislaus' son Louis died in battle and the Habsburg Ferdinand I was elected as his successor.

Habsburg rule (1526–1918) 

After the death of King Louis II of Hungary and Bohemia in 1526, Ferdinand I of Austria was elected King of Bohemia and thus ruler of the Crown of Bohemia (including Moravia). The epoch 1526–1620 was marked by increasing animosity between Catholic Habsburg kings (emperors) and the Protestant Moravian nobility (and other Crowns') estates. Moravia, like Bohemia, was a Habsburg possession until the end of World War I. In 1573 the Jesuit University of Olomouc was established; this was the first university in Moravia. The establishment of a special papal seminary, Collegium Nordicum, made the University a centre of the Catholic Reformation and effort to revive Catholicism in Central and Northern Europe. The second largest group of students were from Scandinavia.

Brno and Olomouc served as Moravia's capitals until 1641. As the only city to successfully resist the Swedish invasion, Brno become the sole capital following the capture of Olomouc. The Margraviate of Moravia had, from 1348 in Olomouc and Brno, its own Diet, or parliament, zemský sněm (Landtag in German), whose deputies from 1905 onward were elected separately from the ethnically separate German and Czech constituencies.

The oldest surviving theatre building in Central Europe, the Reduta Theatre, was established in 17th-century Moravia. Ottoman Turks and Tatars invaded the region in 1663, taking 12,000 captives. In 1740, Moravia was invaded by Prussian forces under Frederick the Great, and Olomouc was forced to surrender on 27 December 1741. A few months later the Prussians were repelled, mainly because of their unsuccessful siege of Brno in 1742. In 1758, Olomouc was besieged by Prussians again, but this time its defenders forced the Prussians to withdraw following the Battle of Domstadtl. In 1777, a new Moravian bishopric was established in Brno, and the Olomouc bishopric was elevated to an archbishopric. In 1782, the Margraviate of Moravia was merged with Austrian Silesia into Moravia-Silesia, with Brno as its capital. Moravia became a separate crown land of Austria again in 1849, and then became part of Cisleithanian Austria-Hungary after 1867. According to Austro-Hungarian census of 1910 the proportion of Czechs in the population of Moravia at the time (2.622.000) was 71.8%, while the proportion of Germans was 27.6%.

20th century
Following the break-up of the Austro-Hungarian Empire in 1918, Moravia became part of Czechoslovakia. As one of the five lands of Czechoslovakia, it had restricted autonomy. In 1928 Moravia ceased to exist as a territorial unity and was merged with Czech Silesia into the Moravian-Silesian Land (yet with the natural dominance of Moravia). By the Munich Agreement (1938), the southwestern and northern peripheries of Moravia, which had a German-speaking majority, were annexed by Nazi Germany, and during the German occupation of Czechoslovakia (1939–1945), the remnant of Moravia was an administrative unit within the Protectorate of Bohemia and Moravia. 

In 1945 after the end of World War II and Allied defeat of Germany, Czechoslovakia expelled the ethnic German minority of Moravia to Germany and Austria. The Moravian-Silesian Land was restored with Moravia as part of it and towns and villages that were left by the former German inhabitants, were re-settled by Czechs, Slovaks and reemigrants. In 1949 the territorial division of Czechoslovakia was radically changed, as the Moravian-Silesian Land was abolished and Lands were replaced by "kraje" (regions), whose borders substantially differ from the historical Bohemian-Moravian border, so Moravia politically ceased to exist after more than 1100 years (833–1949) of its history. Although another administrative reform in 1960 implemented (among others) the North Moravian and the South Moravian regions (Severomoravský and Jihomoravský kraj), with capitals in Ostrava and Brno respectively, their joint area was only roughly alike the historical state and, chiefly, there was no land or federal autonomy, unlike Slovakia.

After the fall of the Soviet Union and the whole Eastern Bloc, the Czechoslovak Federal Assembly condemned the cancellation of Moravian-Silesian land and expressed "firm conviction that this injustice will be corrected" in 1990. However, after the breakup of Czechoslovakia into Czech Republic and Slovakia in 1993, Moravian area remained integral to the Czech territory, and the latest administrative division of Czech Republic (introduced in 2000) is similar to the administrative division of 1949. Nevertheless, the federalist or separatist movement in Moravia is completely marginal.

The centuries-lasting historical Bohemian-Moravian border has been preserved up to now only by the Czech Roman Catholic Administration, as the Ecclesiastical Province of Moravia corresponds with the former Moravian-Silesian Land. The popular perception of the Bohemian-Moravian border's location is distorted by the memory of the 1960 regions (whose boundaries are still partly in use).

Economy
An area in South Moravia, around Hodonín and Břeclav, is part of the Viennese Basin. Petroleum and lignite are found there in abundance. The main economic centres of Moravia are Brno, Olomouc and Zlín, plus Ostrava lying directly on the Moravian–Silesian border.  As well as agriculture in general, Moravia is noted for its viticulture; it contains 94% of the Czech Republic's vineyards and is at the centre of the country's wine industry. Wallachia have at least a 400-year-old tradition of slivovitz making.

The Czech automotive industry also had a large role in the industry of Moravia in the 20th century; the factories of Wikov in Prostějov and Tatra in Kopřivnice produced many automobiles.

Moravia is also the centre of the Czech firearm industry, as the vast majority of Czech firearms manufacturers (e.g. CZUB, Zbrojovka Brno, Czech Small Arms, Czech Weapons, ZVI, Great Gun) are found in Moravia. Almost all the well-known Czech sporting, self-defence, military and hunting firearms are made in Moravia. Meopta rifle scopes are of Moravian origin. The original Bren gun was conceived here, as were the assault rifles the CZ-805 BREN and Sa vz. 58, and the handguns CZ 75 and ZVI Kevin (also known as the "Micro Desert Eagle").

The Zlín Region hosts several aircraft manufacturers, namely Let Kunovice (also known as Aircraft Industries, a.s.), ZLIN AIRCRAFT a.s. Otrokovice (formerly known under the name Moravan Otrokovice), Evektor-Aerotechnik and Czech Sport Aircraft. Sport aircraft are also manufactured in Jihlava by Jihlavan Airplanes/Skyleader.

Aircraft production in the region started in 1930s; after a period of low production post-1989, there are signs of recovery post-2010, and production is expected to grow from 2013 onwards.

Machinery industry 
The machinery industry has been the most important industrial sector in the region, especially in South Moravia, for many decades. The main centres of machinery production are Brno (Zbrojovka Brno, Zetor, První brněnská strojírna, Siemens), Blansko (ČKD Blansko, Metra), Kuřim (TOS Kuřim), Boskovice (Minerva, Novibra) and Břeclav (Otis Elevator Company). A number of other, smaller machinery and machine parts factories, companies and workshops are spread over Moravia.

Electrical industry 
The beginnings of the electrical industry in Moravia date back to 1918. The biggest centres of electrical production are Brno (VUES, ZPA Brno, EM Brno), Drásov, Frenštát pod Radhoštěm and Mohelnice (currently Siemens).

Cities and towns

Cities
Brno, c. 381,000 inhabitants, former land capital and nowadays capital of South Moravian Region; industrial, judicial, educational and research centre; railway and motorway junction
Ostrava, c. 288,000 inh. (central part, Moravská Ostrava, lies historically in Moravia, most of the outskirts are in Czech Silesia), capital of Moravian-Silesian Region, centre of heavy industry
Olomouc, c. 101,000 inh., capital of Olomouc Region, medieval land capital, seat of Roman Catholic archbishop, cultural centre of Hanakia and Central Moravia
Zlín, c. 75,000 inh., capital of Zlín Region, modern city developed after World War I by the Bata Shoes company
Frýdek-Místek, c. 56,000 inh., twin-city lying directly on the old Moravian-Silesian border (the western part, Místek, is Moravian), in the industrial area around Ostrava
Jihlava, c. 51,000 inh. (mostly in Moravia, northwestern periphery lies in Bohemia), capital of Vysočina Region, centre of the Moravian Highlands
Prostějov, c. 44,000 inh., former centre of clothing and fashion industry, birthplace of Edmund Husserl
Přerov, c. 43,000 inh., important railway hub and archeological site (Předmostí)

Towns
Třebíč (35,000), another centre in the Highlands, with exceptionally preserved Jewish quarter
Znojmo (34,000), historical and cultural centre of southwestern Moravia
Kroměříž (29,000), historical town in southern Hanakia
Vsetín (26,000), centre of the Moravian Wallachia
Šumperk (26,000), centre of the north of Moravia, at the foot of Hrubý Jeseník
Uherské Hradiště (25,000), cultural centre of the Moravian Slovakia
Břeclav (25,000), important railway hub in the very south of Moravia
Hodonín (25,000), another town in the Moravian Slovakia, the birthplace of Tomáš Garrigue Masaryk
Nový Jičín (23,000), historical town with hatting industry
Valašské Meziříčí (22,000), centre of chemical industry in Moravian Wallachia
Kopřivnice (22,000), centre of automotive industry (Tatra), south from Ostrava
Vyškov (21,000), local centre at a motorway junction halfway between Brno and Olomouc
Žďár nad Sázavou (21,000), industrial town in the Highlands, near the border with Bohemia
Blansko (20,000), industrial town north from Brno, at the foot of the Moravian Karst

People

The Moravians are generally a Slavic ethnic group who speak various (generally more archaic) dialects of Czech. Before the expulsion of Germans from Moravia the Moravian German minority also referred to themselves as "Moravians" (Mährer). Those expelled and their descendants continue to identify as Moravian.
 Some Moravians assert that Moravian is a language distinct from Czech; however, their position is not widely supported by academics and the public. Some Moravians identify as an ethnically distinct group; the majority consider themselves to be ethnically Czech. In the census of 1991 (the first census in history in which respondents were allowed to claim Moravian nationality), 1,362,000 (13.2%) of the Czech population identified as being of Moravian nationality (or ethnicity). In some parts of Moravia (mostly in the centre and south), majority of the population identified as Moravians, rather than Czechs. In the census of 2001, the number of Moravians had decreased to 380,000 (3.7% of the country's population). In the census of 2011, this number rose to 522,474 (4.9% of the Czech population).

Moravia historically had a large minority of ethnic Germans, some of whom had arrived as early as the 13th century at the behest of the Přemyslid dynasty. Germans continued to come to Moravia in waves, culminating in the 18th century. They lived in the main city centres and in the countryside along the border with Austria (stretching up to Brno) and along the border with Silesia at Jeseníky, and also in two language islands, around Jihlava and around Moravská Třebová. After the World War II, the Czechoslovak government almost fully expelled them in retaliation for their support of Nazi Germany's invasion and dismemberment of Czechoslovakia (1938–1939) and subsequent German war crimes (1938–1945) towards the Czech, Moravian, and Jewish populations.

Moravians

Notable people from Moravia include (in order of birth):

Anton Pilgram (1450–1516), architect, sculptor and woodcarver
Jan Ámos Komenský (Comenius) (1592–1670), educator and theologian, last bishop of Unity of the Brethren
Georg Joseph Camellus (1661–1706), Jesuit missionary to the Philippines, pharmacist and botanist 
David Zeisberger (1717–1807) Moravian missionary to the Leni Lenape, "Apostle to the Indians"
Georgius Prochaska (1749–1820), ophthalmologist and physiologist
František Palacký (1798–1876), historian and politician, "The Father of the Czech nation"
Gregor Mendel (1822–1884), founder of genetics
Ernst Mach (1838–1916), physicist and philosopher
Tomáš Garrigue Masaryk (1850–1937), philosopher and politician, first president of Czechoslovakia
Leoš Janáček (1854–1928), composer
Sigmund Freud (1856–1939), founder of psychoanalysis
Edmund Husserl (1859–1938), philosopher
Alfons Mucha (1860–1939), painter
Zdeňka Wiedermannová-Motyčková (1868–1915), women's rights activist
Adolf Loos (1870–1933), architect, pioneer of functionalism
Karl Renner (1870–1950), Austrian statesman, co-founder of Friends of Nature movement
Tomáš Baťa (1876–1932), entrepreneur, founder of Bata Shoes company

Joseph Schumpeter (1883–1950), economist and political scientist
Marie Jeritza (1887–1982), soprano singer 
Hans Krebs (1888–1947), Nazi SS Brigadeführer executed for war crimes
Ludvík Svoboda (1895–1979), general of I Czechoslovak Army Corps, seventh president of Czechoslovakia
Klement Gottwald (1896–1953), first Czechoslovak communist president
Erich Wolfgang Korngold (1897–1957), composer
George Placzek (1905–1955), physicist, participant in Manhattan Project
Kurt Gödel (1906–1978), theoretical mathematician
Oskar Schindler (1908–1974), Nazi Germany entrepreneur, saviour of almost 1,200 Jews during the WWII
Jan Kubiš (1913–1942), paratrooper who assassinated Nazi despot R. Heydrich
Bohumil Hrabal (1914–1997), writer
Thomas J. Bata (1914–2008), entrepreneur, son of Tomáš Baťa and former head of the Bata shoe company
Emil Zátopek (1922–2000), long-distance runner, multiple Olympic gold medalist
Karel Reisz (1926–2002), filmmaker, pioneer of the British Free Cinema movement
Milan Kundera (born 1929), writer
Václav Nedomanský (born 1944), ice hockey player
Karel Kryl (1944–1994), poet and protest singer-songwriter
Karel Loprais (1949–2021), truck race driver, multiple winner of the Dakar Rally
Ivana Trump (1949–2022), socialite and business magnate, former wife of Donald Trump
Ivan Lendl (born 1959), tennis player
Petr Nečas (born 1964), politician, Czech Prime Minister 2010–2013
Paulina Porizkova (born 1965), model, actress, writer
Jana Novotná (1968–2017), tennis player
Jiří Šlégr (born 1971), ice hockey player, member of the Triple Gold Club
Bohuslav Sobotka (born 1971), social-democratic politician, Czech Prime Minister 2014–2017
Magdalena Kožená (born 1973), mezzo-soprano
Markéta Irglová (born 1988), Academy awarded singer-songwriter
Petra Kvitová (born 1990), tennis player
Adam Ondra (born 1993), rock climber
Barbora Krejčíková (born 1996), tennis player

Ethnographic regions
Moravia can be divided on dialectal and lore basis into several ethnographic regions of comparable significance. In this sense, it is more heterogenous than Bohemia. Significant parts of Moravia, usually those formerly inhabited by the German speakers, are dialectally indifferent, as they have been resettled by people from various Czech (and Slovak) regions.

The principal cultural regions of Moravia are:

Hanakia (Haná) in the central and northern part
Lachia (Lašsko) in the northeastern tip
Highlands (Horácko) in the west
Moravian Slovakia (Slovácko) in the southeast
Moravian Wallachia (Valašsko) in the east

Places of interest

World Heritage Sites
Gardens and Castle at Kroměříž
Historic Centre of Telč
Holy Trinity Column in Olomouc
Jewish Quarter and St Procopius' Basilica in Třebíč
Lednice-Valtice Cultural Landscape
Pilgrimage Church of St John of Nepomuk at Zelená Hora
Tugendhat Villa in Brno

Other
Hranice Abyss, the deepest known underwater cave in the world

See also
Extreme points of Moravia
Flag of Moravia
German South Moravia
Moravian traditional music

Notes

References

Further reading
 The Penny Cyclopaedia of the Society for the Diffusion of Useful ... (1877), volume 15. London, Charles Knight. Moravia. pp. 397–398.
 The New Encyclopædia Britannica (2003). Chicago, New Delhi, Paris, Seoul, Sydney, Taipei, Tokyo. Volume 8. p. 309. Moravia. .
 Filip, Jan (1964). The Great Moravia exhibition. ČSAV (Czechoslovak Academy of Sciences).
 Galuška, Luděk, Mitáček Jiří, Novotná, Lea (eds.) (2010) Treausures of Moravia: story of historical land. Brno, Moravian Museum. .
 National Geographic Society. Wonders of the Ancient World; National Geographic Atlas of Archaeology, Norman Hammond, consultant, Nat'l Geogr. Soc., (multiple staff authors), (Nat'l Geogr., R. H. Donnelley & Sons, Willard, OH), 1994, 1999, Reg or Deluxe Ed., 304 pp. Deluxe ed. photo (p. 248): "Venus, Dolni Věstonice, 24,000 B.C." In section titled: "The Potter's Art", pp. 246–253.
 Dekan, Jan (1981). Moravia Magna: The Great Moravian Empire, Its Art and Time, Minneapolis: Control Data Arts. .
 Hugh, Agnew (2004). The Czechs and the Lands of the Bohemian Crown.Hoower Press, Stanford. .
 Róna-Tas, András (1999) Hungarians & Europe in the Early Middle Ages: An Introduction to Early Hungarian History translated by Nicholas Bodoczky, Central European University Press, Budapest, .
 Wihoda, Martin (2015), Vladislaus Henry: The Formation of Moravian Identity. Brill Publishers .
 Kirschbaum, Stanislav J. (1996) A History of Slovakia: The Struggle for Survival St. Martin's Press, New York, .
 Constantine Porphyrogenitus De Administrando Imperio edited by Gy. Moravcsik, translated by R. J. H. Jenkins, Dumbarton Oaks Edition, Washington, D.C. (1993)
 Hlobil, Ivo, Daniel, Ladislav (2000), The last flowers of the middle ages: from the gothic to the renaissance in Moravia and Silesia. Olomouc/Brno, Moravian Galery, Muzeum umění Olomouc 
 David, Jiří (2009). "Moravian estatism and provincial councils in the second half of the 17th century". Folia historica Bohemica. 1 24: 111–165. .
 Svoboda, Jiří A. (1999), Hunters between East and West: the paleolithic of Moravia. New York: Plenum Press, .
 Absolon, Karel (1949),  The diluvial anthropomorphic statuettes and drawings, especially the so-called Venus statuettes, discovered in Moravia  New York, Salmony 1949. .
 Musil, Rudolf (1971), G. Mendel's Discovery and the Development of Agricultural and Natural Sciences in Moravia. Brno, Moravian Museum.
 Šimsa, Martin (2009), Open-Air Museum of Rural Architecture in South-East Moravia. Strážnice, National Institute of Folk Culture. .
 Miller, Michael R. (2010), The Jews of Moravia in the Age of Emancipation, Cover of Rabbis and Revolution edition. Stanford University Press. .
 Bata, Thomas J. (1990), Bata: Shoemaker to the World. Stoddart Publishers Canada. .
 Procházka, Jiří (2009), "Vienna obsessa. Thesaurus Moraviae". Brno, ITEM, .

External links

 Moravian museum official website  
 Moravian gallery official website 
 Moravian library official website 
 Moravian land archive official website  
 Province of Moravia – Czech Catholic Church – official website 
 Welcome to the 2nd largest city of the CR 
 Welcome to Olomouc, city of good cheer... 
 Znojmo – City of Virtue 
 

 
Counties of the Holy Roman Empire
Geography of Central Europe
Geography of the Czech Republic
Historic counties in Moravia
Historical regions in the Czech Republic
Historical regions
Subdivisions of Austria-Hungary